Morton J. "Chuck" Mills (December 1, 1928 – January 18, 2021) was an American college football coach. He served as the head coach at Pomona College (1957–1961), Indiana University of Pennsylvania (1962–1963), the United States Merchant Marine Academy (1964), Utah State University (1967–1972), Wake Forest University (1973–1977), Southern Oregon University (1980–1988), and the United States Coast Guard Academy (1997).

Education
A native of Chicago, Illinois, Mills graduated from Illinois State University in 1950.

Coaching career
Hired in February 1967 at Utah State University, Mills was previously the offensive coordinator with the Kansas City Chiefs, the champions of the American Football League (AFL). Previous USU head coach Tony Knap had resigned in January for an assistant coaching position with the BC Lions in the Canadian Football League (CFL).

During his six seasons at Utah State, Mills' Aggies went ; 8–3 marks in 1971 and 1972 were the best. He took the first American collegiate football team to Japan in December 1971; the Japanese equivalent of the Heisman Trophy, known as the "Mills Trophy," is presented to the top collegiate football player in Japan each year.

Death
In mid-January 2021, Mills was hospitalized in a Honolulu hospital for pneumonia and organ failure. He died on the morning of January 18, 2021, at age 92.

Head coaching record

College

References

1928 births
2021 deaths
Arizona Wildcats football coaches
Citrus College people
Coast Guard Bears athletic directors
Coast Guard Bears football coaches
College football bowl executives
High school football coaches in California
High school football coaches in Illinois
Illinois State University alumni
IUP Crimson Hawks football coaches
Junior college football coaches in the United States
Kansas City Chiefs coaches
Merchant Marine Mariners football coaches
Pomona-Pitzer Sagehens football coaches
Southern Oregon Raiders athletic directors
Southern Oregon Raiders football coaches
Sportspeople from Chicago
University of Tulsa alumni
Utah State Aggies football coaches
Wake Forest Demon Deacons football coaches
Deaths from pneumonia in Hawaii
Deaths from organ failure